The 2005 OFC Club Championship was the 4th edition of the top-level Oceanic club football tournament organized by the Oceania Football Confederation (OFC), and the 1st since 2001. The tournament was held in Papeete, Tahiti. The preliminary rounds were played from 10 February until 6 April 2005, with the finals beginning on 30 May and ending on 10 June 2005.

The tournament was initially planned to take place in September 2002, in anticipation of the upcoming FIFA Club World Championship in the following year, in order to decide which team would represent Oceania at the tournament. However, this tournament was cancelled, and therefore so too was the Oceanic competition. With the return of the tournament in 2005, the OFC Club Championship went ahead, and the winner went on to represent Oceania at the 2005 FIFA Club World Championship.

The winner of the tournament was Sydney FC of Australia, who beat AS Magenta of New Caledonia in the final.

Participants

The following teams entered the competition.

Preliminary round
A preliminary round was held, with the format being a two-legged playoff to determine who went through to the final round. The Australian representative (Sydney FC), as the representative of the strongest OFC Nation, and the two Tahitian Teams (AS Pirae and AS Manu Ura), as hosts, were seeded to the main draw.

The travelling team played two matches in the host country.  The aggregate scores are shown.

|}

Notes
Note 1: Auckland City received a bye because Manumea were withdrawn by the Oceania Football Confederation.
Note 2: Both legs were played in Auckland, New Zealand.

First leg

Second leg

Magenta won 9–1 on aggregate.

Sobou won 7–0 on aggregate.

Tafea won 7–1 on aggregate.

Makuru won 8–2 on aggregate.

Group stage
The eight remaining teams were separated into two groups, each team playing the other teams once.  The top two teams from each group progressed to the semifinals.

Group A

Group B

Knockout stage

Semi finals
The top two teams from both groups progressed to the semifinals.

Third Place Playoff

Final

Top scorers

NB: This table does not include Preliminary round results

External links
 RSSSF archive of the 2004/5 Oceania Club Championship

2005
Club
2005 in French Polynesian sport
2005 in Australian soccer
2004–05 in New Zealand association football